The Noida Sector 153 is an under-construction metro station of the Noida Metro railway, in the city of Noida in India.

References

External links

Railway stations in Gautam Buddh Nagar district
Noida Metro stations